Milo Poulson is an alternative cartoonist known for the exploration of gay themes in his comics.  His work was included in Gay Comix.

References

External links
 Comic Book Database
 Guide to the Lesbian, Gay, Bisexual, Transgender (LGBT) Collection at the Smithsonian Institution National Museum of American History Archives Center

Alternative cartoonists
Living people
LGBT comics creators
Underground cartoonists
Year of birth missing (living people)